Sødal is a neighbourhood in the city of Kristiansand in Agder county, Norway. It's located in the Lund borough on the east bank of river Otra. Previously it has been farmed and a limestone quarry and a still existing lime kiln located at Sødal. In 1803, four aggressive wolves were caught in outlying areas. Sødal is currently a residential area. At the Torridalsveien (County Road 1) there is a tollgate which is a part of the toll ring around Kristiansand.

References

Populated places in Agder
Neighbourhoods of Kristiansand
Geography of Kristiansand